The simple station Calle 146 is part of the TransMilenio mass-transit system of Bogotá, Colombia, which opened in the year 2000.

Location

The station is located in northern Bogotá, specifically on Autopista Norte with Calle 150.

It serves the Margaritas and Victoria Norte neighborhoods.

History

After the opening of the Portal de Usme in early 2001, the Autopista Norte line was opened. This station was added as a northerly expansion of that line, which was completed with the opening of the Portal del Norte later that year.

The station is named Calle 146 due to its proximity to that major road, though it serves the Cedritos residential area.

Station Services

Old trunk services

Main line service

Feeder routes

This station does not have connections to feeder routes.

Inter-city service

This station does not have inter-city service.

External links
TransMilenio

See also
Bogotá
TransMilenio
List of TransMilenio Stations

TransMilenio